"How Far We've Come" is a song by American alternative rock group Matchbox Twenty. It was released in September 2007 as the lead single from their retrospective collection, Exile on Mainstream, which was released on October 2, 2007. The music video premiered on VH1's Top 20 Countdown on September 1, 2007. The CD single comes with two live covers as B-sides; "Remedy" by The Black Crowes and "Modern Love" by David Bowie. These two songs are also on the Best Buy version of Exile on Mainstream.

The Phonographic Performance Company of Australia announced that "How Far We've Come" was the most played recording in Australia in 2008. The PPCA also announced that Matchbox Twenty was the third most played artist in 2008.

Track listing
EP version
 "How Far We've Come" (radio edit) – 3:31
 "Remedy" (live) – 4:31
 "Modern Love" (live) – 3:51

Personnel
Rob Thomas - lead vocals, acoustic guitar, piano
Kyle Cook - lead guitar, mandolin, backing vocals
Paul Doucette - rhythm guitar, backing vocals
Brian Yale - bass
Ryan MacMillan - drums

Chart performance
The single debuted at #93 on the U.S. Billboard Hot 100, but after being released digitally, it jumped to #12, making it the second-biggest jump of 2007 behind Beyoncé and Shakira's "Beautiful Liar" (which jumped 91 spots). It peaked at #11 on the U.S Billboard Hot 100. It also reached #3 on the U.S. Adult Top 40. On the Australian ARIA Singles Chart it debuted at #8, becoming their most successful single in Australia since the band's 1997 breakout hit "Push". It later rose to #7 there, becoming the band's highest-charting single there. In Canada it reached the top five, and it peaked at #11 in New Zealand.

Charts

Year-end charts

Certifications

Music video
The music video is a three-minute and twenty-six second montage of many historical events around the world during the late 20th Century, tying in with the lyrics on human affairs and its role in cultural development. The video debuted on VH1 Top 20 Video Countdown on September 1, 2007. It contains many important events that changed the world in a roughly chronological order. The events are:

 Scenes from the civil rights movement (1950s)
 September 11 on the WTC (2001)
 John F. Kennedy's assassination (1963)
 Muhammad Ali winning the rematch against Sonny Liston in the first round (1965)
 Woodstock (1969)
 Women marching for equal rights (1970s)
 Pelé in a soccer match
 The tearing down of the Berlin Wall (1989)
 Tank Man during the Tiananmen Square protests of 1989
 Early personal computers on an assembly line (1970s, 1980s)
 Live Aid (1985)
 New Year's celebrations across the world at the beginning of the 21st century (including Egypt, Paris) (2000)
 Death of Princess Diana in Paris (1997)
 The Oslo Accords (1993)
 Live Earth including Al Gore (2007)
 Barack Obama and Hillary Clinton, Democratic candidates for the 2008 United States presidential primaries

The video ends with many of the clips flashing quickly across the screen in reverse order at the end of the song.

In Australia a different video was released, featuring the band performing in a neighbourhood filled with children. Around the middle of the song a girl with a piece of chalk walks out into the middle of the street and begins to draw a large circle. As she draws that circle a solar eclipse begins. The moment the girl finishes the circle the eclipse becomes complete, and everyone vanishes from the neighbourhood. The clip ends with pictures of the toys the children were playing falling to the ground.

In popular culture
In December 2007, the title track was used in promotions for the 2008 programs on The Discovery Channel, TNT, History Channel and the Sci Fi Channel, and also by NASCAR for their 60th Anniversary promotions, complete with videos of notable races.
The song was used prior to New York Mets games at Shea Stadium in 2008 to commemorate the final year for the venue, was replaced by Citi Field at the end of the season; the song is also played prior to announcing the starting lineup at San Diego Padres home games, with the scoreboard showing a montage of highlights of that franchises 40-year history.  The song was used in a promo for season 2 of The Riches, a trailer for Role Models and at rallies for Barack Obama in Seattle, Washington and Madison, Wisconsin.
The song was made available for download on September 11, 2012, to play in Rock Band 3 Basic and PRO mode utilizing real guitar / bass guitar, and MIDI compatible electronic drum kits / keyboards.
In March 2015, Content Creator Lewis "Linkara" Lovhaug uploaded his "History of Power Rangers RPM" video, a part of his retrospective on the history of Power Rangers.  The song was used in a montage about how far the franchise had come by that point, and was later referenced in his video on Power Rangers Super Megaforce, and on how Megaforce felt like the franchise went backwards with its two seasons as well as with Power Rangers Samurai.

References

External links
 Matchbox Twenty official website
 Top40.entertainmenthit.com

2007 songs
2007 singles
Matchbox Twenty songs
Songs written by Rob Thomas (musician)
Song recordings produced by Steve Lillywhite
Songs written by Paul Doucette
Songs written by Kyle Cook
Songs written by Brian Yale
Atlantic Records singles